Rosa Rosenberg (January 8, 1921 – April 23, 1981) was a surrealist Mexican painter. Born in Lemberg, Poland (now Lviv, Ukraine) she emigrated to Mexico at the age of two. She studied painting privately; in 1966 she won first place in the competition "Nuevos Valores", which had been put on by the Hebrew Sports Center. She exhibited work between 1968 and 1975, her work was featured in a group exhibition in 1975 at the Palacio de Bellas Artes. Her last solo exhibition was at Galeria Lanai in May 1979. She died in Mexico City.

Early life 
Rosa Rosenberg (maiden name Seifer) was born in Lviv, Poland to parents Ignacio Seifer and María Lazchower. The Seifers moved to Mexico escaping social upheaval and unrest in Poland. Accompanied by Ignacio's mother, Ethel, and Rosa's older sister, Lea, they arrived in the port of Veracruz in November 1923, immediately after they established residence in Mexico City. In the following years, two more daughters were born to the marriage, Dora and Flora.

She attended an elementary school located in the street of Correo Mayor, and middle school at Secundaria Número Dos, she later obtained a degree in Commerce and Administration, and studied English and French. In 1942 she married Moishe Rosenberg, an Ashkenazi Jewish immigrant who owned a jewelry store in the central area of Mexico City.

Her first child died shortly after birth, and her second, Samuel, perished in an accident at the age of 23, she had two more children, León and Florence Rosenberg.

Professional career 
In 1966 Rosa won first prize in the competition "Nuevos Valores” at the Centro Deportivo Israelita. Two years later, in 1968, she was invited to participate in a large scale collective show at the Galería Chapultepec as part of the Festival Internacional de las Artes, a cultural program of the XIX Olympic games held in Mexico City.

Rosenberg opened her first solo exhibition on August 13, 1968, at the Galería Jack Misrachi. Invitations for the show featured text praising her work by film director Alejandro Jodorowsky, this collection was positively reviewed in several newspapers, including Últimas Noticias, El Heraldo de México, El Día, The News, Novedades, Excélsior, and others.

On September 29, 1970, her second solo show opened at the Mer-Kup gallery owned by art dealer Merle de Kuper. Obtaining similar critical response as the Misrachi show, her career would launch into more invitations to group exhibitions and interviews by local reporters where her work was compared to the likes of Remedios Varo, Leonora Carrington, and Salvador Dalí.

Her first international appearance happened at the Mabat Galleries in Tel Aviv, where Mexican Ambassador Rosario Castellanos, spoke at the inaugural event. During July and August 1975, as a part of International Women's Year, her work was included in the group exhibit titled 'La mujer y la plástica' at the Palacio de Bellas Artes museum.

On May 22, 1979, her last solo show, 'Surrealismo y Fantasía' opened at the Galería Lanai showing 17 oil paintings. In the same year, the Enciclopedia de México includes, for the first time, a short entry about her.

List of exhibitions 
Individual
 August 1968, Galería Jack Misrachi
 September 1970, Galería Mer-Kup
 August 1971, Mabat Galleries
 October 1975, Club de Golf Bellavista
 May 1979, Galería Lanai.

Group
 December 1966, Centro Deportivo Israelita
 February 1968, Galería Chapultepec
 October 1970, Centro Deportivo Israelita
 April – May 1971, Galería Mer-Kup
 February 1974, Westside Jewish Community Center, Los Angeles, California
 July – August 1975, Palacio de Bellas Artes
 September 1976, Centro Deportivo Israelita
 September 1977, Galería Mer-Kup
 October 1977, Galería Silvya Ocerkovsky
 May 1978, Centro Deportivo Israelita

References

1921 births
1981 deaths
Mexican women painters
20th-century Mexican painters
20th-century Mexican women artists
Artists from Mexico City
Polish emigrants to Mexico
Mexican Jews